Thomas Rowley (1721–1796) was a famous poet of Vermont, known both as the spokesman for Ethan Allen and dubbed “The Bard of the Green Mountains.” During his lifetime and before the American Revolution, his poetry gained the reputation with the catchphrase of "Setting the Hills on Fire."

Biography

Thomas Rowley was born on March 24, 1721 in Hebron, Connecticut, the son of Samuel Rowley and Elizabeth Fuller and great grandson of Samuel Fuller (Mayflower).  Thomas married Lois Cass in Hebron in 1744 and they had seven known children in Hebron and Kent, Connecticut.

Thomas Rowley moved to the town of Danby, Rutland County, Vermont in 1768, with his wife and family. The Rowleys are listed as some of the first settlers of Danby, Thomas was the first town clerk.  In Rutland County, Thomas became acquainted with and joined with Ethan Allen and the Green Mountain Boys a growing Vermont militia named after the Green Mountains of Vermont comprised mostly from freemen in Rutland County and neighboring Addison County. The Green Mountain Boys were concerned New York would claim all the lands of Vermont known at the time as a dispute over the New Hampshire Grants. As Ethan Allen's spokesman, Rowley's poetry became legendary for the proverbial "setting the hills on fire." That is, he motivated the men of Vermont to fight for their independence as a state against the threat of the New York state feudal system.

As early as 1774, Thomas Rowley moved even further north to the eastern shore of Lake Champlain to the town of Shoreham in Addison County, Vermont, with his wife and family. The state of New York was visible right across the lake. Here Thomas built a hotel. His land was known as "Rowley's Point" at the current landmark of Larabee's Point.

During the American Revolution, the American settlers abandoned Shoreham and the Champlain Valley as the British dominated the lake region.  Thomas returned to live in the town of Danby during the American Revolution. He served as Danby's town clerk and representative in the General Assembly from 1778 to 1782.

After the war ended, Thomas Rowley returned to live in Shoreham as early as 1783. He is on record serving as the initial surveyor and clerk of Shoreham in 1783. He resided in Shoreham for the rest of his life as an innkeeper and farmer. Thomas died 1796 in Benson or Cold Springs, Vermont, at the home of his son, Nathan Rowley.

Poetry and influence

Thomas Rowley's verses were mainly published in the Rural Magazine and the Bennington Gazette. One of Rowley's motivational poems, simply called "To Rutland Go" over the years, was originally published with a longer title which invited new settlers to Vermont as the paradise compared to New York, as follows: An Invitation to the Poor Tenants that Live Under Their Poor Patrons in the Province of New York, To Come and Settle on Our Good Lands, Under the New Hampshire Grants. This poem is exemplary of his style and message:  
   

Rowley's poetry actually focused not only on politics, but also on the pleasantness and rustic nature of pioneer life, with humor and witty observations. For example, in another poetic inventory of his "estate", he sums up that he has virtually nothing, but still he was independent and happy.

Notable poems

To Rutland Go
When Caesar Reigned King In Rome 
This poem was written to complain that New York courts sentenced Ethan Allen to death, circa 1774 and attached to a petition by Ethan Allen.

Notes

References

 Hemingway, Abby Maria, editor. "Poets and Poetry of Vermont", Hemingway Volume 29, (Boston: Brown, Taggard & Chase; Brattleboro, Vermont: W. Felton, 1860).
 DAR. The National Society of the Daughters of the American Revolution (DAR) Rolls of Honor, 5:126; 25:49; 162:236.
 Vermont Historical Society. Vermont History, 37:249; 65:434.
 Shoreham, Vermont Place Names, p. 63
 The Literature of Vermont. Hanover: University Press of New England, 1973.
 Town of Shoreham, Original Town Records, p. 14–15.
 MacIntire, Susan and Witherell, Sanford. Genealogical Register of the Families of Shoreham. VT: 1984.
 Williams, John C. The History and Map of Danby, Vermont, McLean & Robbins, 1869. pp. 13, 18, 21–22, 30–36, 70, 92, 239–244, 253. 
 Mayflower Families Through Five Generations: Volume Ten, Family of Samuel Fuller, General Society of Mayflower Descendants, 1996

American male poets
1721 births
1796 deaths
People from Danby, Vermont
People of pre-statehood Vermont
18th-century American poets
18th-century American male writers
People from Hebron, Connecticut
Poets from Vermont
People from Kent, Connecticut